Andropolia diversilineata is a moth in the family Noctuidae first described by Augustus Radcliffe Grote in 1877. It is found in western North America, from British Columbia south to California.

The wingspan is about 44 mm. Adults are on wing in late summer.

The larvae feed on Purshia tridentata.

References

External links
Macromoths of Northwest Forests and Woodlands

Acronictinae
Moths of North America
Moths described in 1877